Ferike Boros (3 August 1873 – 16 January 1951) was a Hungarian-born American stage and movie actress.

Biography

Ferike Weinstock was born in Nagyvárad, Austria-Hungary, in 1873, Boros was on stage starting in 1893. She moved to London in 1903, two years later appearing at Covent Garden. In Hungary, she performed in the National Court Theatre (NCT) in Budapest.  

In 1909, while still with the NCT, she visited the United States and Canada as part of a trip around the world to report on how dramatic productions were staged in each country that she visited. 

As she visited various theatrical managers in New York City, she regularly encountered rejection despite her official letter (written in English) from the NCT. In one office she was told, "Oh, Mr. Belasco is flooded with crazy communications from freaks and fakirs and cranks ..."

After being well-coached in English and the conventions of American show business, she had a long career on the Broadway stage and in theatrical touring companies, from 1909 through 1927; thereafter she was seen in character roles in motion pictures.

Boros' Broadway acting credits included Chicago (1926), The Kreutzer Sonata (1924), Rachel (1913), and The Wife Decides (1911). She also translated the Broadway play Seven Sisters (1911).

Boros went to Hollywood in 1930, acting in character roles for several studios. A fall in 1936 injured her hip, which both ended her income and brought about expensive medical treatment. In order to pay her bills, she mortgaged her house, sold most of her possessions, got rid of her servants, and began receiving $10 per week in relief payments. She returned to acting with a one-minute appearance in Love Affair (1939).

Although her screen roles were mostly in the supporting category, she performed and contributed to the plot in popular films such as Once Upon a Honeymoon and A Tree Grows in Brooklyn.

Death
Boros died in her home in Van Nuys, California, on 16 January 1951, aged 77.

Filmography

 Her Boy (1918) as Mrs. Schultz
 The Younger Generation (1929) as Delancey Street Woman (uncredited)
 Born Reckless (1930) as Ma Beretti
 Ladies Love Brutes (1930) as Mrs. Forziati
 Little Caesar (1931) as Mrs. Passa (uncredited)
 Gentleman's Fate (1931) as Angela (as Ferike Beros)
 Svengali (1931) as Marta (uncredited)
 Bought! (1931) as Minor Role (uncredited)
 Private Lives (1931) as Cook at Chalet (uncredited)
 World and the Flesh (1932) as Sasha
 Huddle (1932) as Mrs. Amatto
 No Living Witness (1932) as Nick's Mother
 Uptown New York (1932) as Elderly Woman (uncredited)
 Humanity (1933) as Mrs. Bernstein
 Song of the Eagle (1933) as Cook (uncredited)
 Rafter Romance (1933) as Rosie Eckbaum (uncredited)
 Eight Girls in a Boat (1934) as Frau Kruger
 The Fountain (1934) as Nurse
 Symphony of Living (1935) as Mary Schultz
 Black Fury (1935) as Wife of Hospitalized Miner (uncredited)
 Hi, Gaucho! (1935) as Emelia - Inez's Dueña (uncredited)
 Make Way for Tomorrow (1937) as Mrs. Sarah Rubens (uncredited)
 Love Affair (1939) as Terry's Landlady (uncredited)
 Bachelor Mother (1939) as Mrs. Weiss
 Stronger Than Desire (1939) as Mrs. D'Amoro
 Fifth Avenue Girl (1939) as Olga
 Dust Be My Destiny (1939) as Delicatessen Proprietress
 Rio (1939) as Maria (as Ferika Boras)
 The Light That Failed (1939) as Madame Binat
 Three Cheers for the Irish (1940) as Tenement Woman (uncredited)
 Lillian Russell (1940) as Mrs. Rose
 La Conga Nights (1940) as Mama O'Brien
 Girl from God's Country (1940) as Mrs. Broken Thumb
 Argentine Nights (1940) as Mama Viejos
 Christmas in July (1940) as Mrs. Schwartz
 Gallant Sons (1940) as Madame Wachek
 Sleepers West (1941) as Farm Lady
 Caught in the Draft (1941) as Yetta
 Private Nurse (1941)as Mrs. Sarah Goldberg
 Unfinished Business (1941) as Sarah (uncredited)
 The Pied Piper (1942) as Madame
 The Talk of the Town (1942) as Mrs. Pulaski (uncredited)
 Once Upon a Honeymoon (1942) as the maid Elsa
 Margin for Error (1943) as Mrs. Finkelstein (uncredited)
 They Got Me Covered (1943) as Laughing Hotel Maid (uncredited)
 Princess O'Rourke (1943) Mrs. Anna Pulaski (uncredited)
 The Doughgirls (1944) as Irena (uncredited)
 A Tree grows in Brooklyn (1945) as Grandma Rommely (uncredited)
 This Love of Ours (1945) as Housekeeper
 Specter of the Rose (1946) as Mamochka
 High Conquest (1947) as Grandmother on Train
 East Side, West Side (1949) as Rosa's Grandma Sistina (uncredited) (final film role)

References

"Actress Ferike Boros Passes at Home Here," The Van Nuys News, Van Nuys, California, page 6-A, Thursday, January 18, 1951.

External links

 
 
 

1873 births
1951 deaths
American film actresses
American stage actresses
Austro-Hungarian emigrants to the United Kingdom
Austro-Hungarian emigrants to the United States